Tirangaa is a 1993 Indian action drama film starring Raaj Kumar, Nana Patekar, Varsha Usgaonkar, Harish Kumar  and  Mamta Kulkarni. The movie was a blockbuster. At the time of 1993 Bombay bombings, Plaza cinema, Mumbai was also bombed where the movie was being shown, leaving 10 dead and 37 injured.

Plot
The film starts with the kidnapping of three nuclear scientists by Pralayanath Gendaswami (Deepak Shirke) as he plans to build nuclear missiles for an invasion of India. Meanwhile, Deputy Inspector General of Police Rudrapratap Chauhan (Suresh Oberoi) an honest police officer is murdered by Pralayanath Gendaswami since he has been on his hitlist. Rudrapatap's son Harish (Harish Kumar) is the only witness of his murder. When the scientists are gone missing, police calls Brigadier Suryadev Singh (Raaj Kumar) to take matter into his hands. Suryadev allies with honest but hot-headed Police Inspector Shivajirao Wagle (Nana Patekar) who spends a lot of time being suspended due to his temper. When Central Minister Jeevanlal Tandel who is an ally of Pralayanath Gendaswami sets up a meeting with him to inform him about Suryadev Singh, Pralayanath Gendaswami questions why is there information about his glory and not a single photograph of his face. At that moment Suryadev Singh enters the auditorium and reveals that he is the one whose face Pralayanath Gendaswami was so eager to see.

Meanwhile, on the New Year's Eve Harish and his friends witness an attempt of murder on Radha Tandel. They rush her to hospital but later on flees as the staff calls police to inquire about the case. Police then trace Harish by his wallet which was left at hospital and charge him with an attempt to rape on Radha.

After knowing who Suryadev is, Pralayanath Gendaswami tries to kill him by planting bomb in his car. But Suryadev's car is a high tech vehicle and hence he makes an escape with his driver/bodyguard Bahadur from a below passage door in car. Then the news is widespread that he has been murdered.

But Suryadev escapes and tells this news to Pralayanath through a TV interview. Pralayanath tries to kidnap Professor Khurana but Suryadev and Waghle fail his attempt. Then Pralayanath tries to kill Harish and his friends, but one of his friends sacrifice his life to save him on the eve of Raksha Bandhan. Pralayanath then again tries to kidnap Professor Khurana but fails to do so, and instead takes the fuse conductor to make his missiles work. Waghle and Suryadev track him down through their trans-meter. Suryadev foils Pralayanath's missiles by taking out the  fuse conductors  and guns him down. Waghle finishes off Pralayanath's son. The film ends with the 15 August programme concluding successfully.

Cast  
Raaj Kumar as Brigadier Suryadev Singh
Nana Patekar as Inspector Shivaji Rao Wagle
Varsha Usgaonkar as Shanti Verma
Harish as Sanjay Chauhan
Mamta Kulkarni as Sandhya Gupta
Deepak Shirke as Pralayanath Gendaswami
Manohar Singh as Chief Minister Jeevanlal Tandel
Arjun as Rasiknath Gendaswami
Aloknath as Home Minister
Suresh Oberoi as DIG Rudrapratap Chauhan
Satyen Kappu as Dr. Gupta
Aparajita as Mrs. Gupta
Anjana Mumtaz as Mrs. Chauhan
Sujit Kumar as Police Commissioner
Shehzad Khan as Inspector who arrests Sanjay Chauhan for rape of Radha Tandel
K. K. Raj as DCP Patania
Joginder as Inspector Satyawadi Dubey
Mahavir Shah as Jailor
Krishan Dhawan as Professor Rangaswamy
Sudhir Dalvi as Professor Nazrul Hassan
Mukesh Rawal as Professor Khurana
Vikas Anand as Judge
Kamaldeep as Judge Hariprasad
Bob Christo as Bob 
Gavin Packard as Tom
Daboo Malik as Alok Verma 
Girish Malik as Ali Khan
Rakesh Bedi as Police Informer Khabarilal
Pankaj Berry as Dr. Sinha
Sonika Gill as Radha Tandel
Mehul Kumar as Municipal Commissioner Tiwari
Ghanashyam Nayak as Ram Lakhan 
Bandini Mishra as Anita Chaudhary
Anil Yadav as Babban

Songs
All lyrics are written by Santosh Anand.
"Pee Le Pee Le Oh More Raja, Pee Le Pee Le Oh More Jani" - Mohammed Aziz, Sudesh Bhosle
"Ise Samjho Na Resham Ka Taar" - Sadhana Sargam
"Oye Rabba Meri Jaan Bacha Le Phans Gayi Dil Ke Rog Me" - Kavita Krishnamurthy, Mohammed Aziz
"Yeh Aan Tirangaa Hai" - Mohammed Aziz
"Ise Samjho Na Resham Ka Taar" (Tragic) - Sadhana Sargam
"Yeh Aan Tirangaa Hai" (Version 2) - Mohammed Aziz
"Aaj Ki Shaam Pyar Karne Walon Ke Naam" - Mohammed Aziz, Kavita Krishnamurthy, Udit Narayan
"Jaane Mann Jaane Mann" - Sadhana Sargam, Mohammed Aziz

In popular culture
Nawazuddin Siddiqui as Asghar Muqaddam refers to the movie for the incidence of planting explosives during interrogation in the movie Black Friday.

References

External links
 

1993 films
1990s Hindi-language films
Films scored by Laxmikant–Pyarelal
Films about nuclear war and weapons
Films directed by Mehul Kumar